Catechu ( or ) is an extract of acacia trees used variously as a food additive, astringent, tannin, and dye. It is extracted from several species of Acacia, but especially Senegalia catechu (Acacia catechu), by boiling the wood in water and evaporating the resulting brew.

Uses
As an astringent it has been used since ancient times in Ayurvedic medicine as well as in breath-freshening spice mixtures—for example in France and Italy it is used in some licorice pastilles. It is also an important ingredient in South Asian cooking paan mixtures, such as ready-made paan masala and gutka.

The catechu mixture is high in natural vegetable tannins (which accounts for its astringent effect), and may be used for the tanning of animal hides. Early research by Humphry Davy in the early 19th century first demonstrated the use of catechu in tanning over more expensive and traditional oak extracts.

Under the name cutch, it is a brown dye used for tanning and dyeing and for preserving fishing nets and sails. Cutch will dye wool, silk, and cotton a yellowish-brown. Cutch gives gray-browns with an iron mordant and olive-browns with a copper mordant.

Black catechu has recently also been used by Blavod Drinks Ltd. to dye their vodka black.

White cutch, also known as gambier, gambeer, or gambir, which is extracted from Uncaria gambir has the same uses. Palm-catechu is extracted from the seeds of Areca catechu.

Derivative chemicals 

The catechu extract gave its name to the catechin and catechol chemical families first derived from it.

See also
 Arid Forest Research Institute

References

External links

An OCR'd version of the US Dispensatory by Remington and Wood, 1918.

Plant dyes
Spices
Tannins